Gunter Creek is a stream in Barry County of southwest Missouri. The headwaters of Gunter Creek are located south of Butterfield and the stream flows northeast to its confluence with Flat Creek south of McDowell.

Gunter Creek has the name of the pioneer Gunter family.

See also
List of rivers of Missouri

References

Rivers of Barry County, Missouri
Rivers of Missouri